is a former Japanese football player.

Club statistics

References

External links

1980 births
Living people
Kokushikan University alumni
Association football people from Kagoshima Prefecture
Japanese footballers
J2 League players
Japan Football League players
Ventforet Kofu players
Matsumoto Yamaga FC players
V-Varen Nagasaki players
FC Ryukyu players
Association football forwards